Rim Jouini (born 7 August 1980) is a Tunisian female boxer. At the 2012 Summer Olympics, she competed in the women's lightweight competition, but was defeated in the first round.

References

Tunisian women boxers
1980 births
Living people
Olympic boxers of Tunisia
Boxers at the 2012 Summer Olympics
African Games bronze medalists for Tunisia
African Games medalists in boxing
Competitors at the 2015 African Games
Lightweight boxers
21st-century Tunisian women